Suundi is a Bantu language spoken in the Republic of the Congo.

References

Kongo language

https://suundi.yolasite.com